HMS Taciturn was a British submarine of the third group of the T class.  built by Vickers Armstrong, Barrow  and launched on 7 June 1944.  So far she has been the only ship of the Royal Navy to bear the name Taciturn.

Service

Taciturn served in the Far East for much of her wartime career, where she sank a Japanese air warning picket hulk (this was the hulk of the salvaged former Dutch submarine ), the Japanese auxiliary submarine chaser Cha 105, and a Japanese sailing vessel.  On 1 August 1945, Taciturn, in company with HMS Thorough, attacked Japanese shipping and shore targets off northern Bali. Taciturn sank two Japanese sailing vessels with gunfire.

She survived the war and continued in service with the Navy, becoming the first ship of the class to undergo the 'Super T' conversion.

On 9 January 1958, Taciturn ran aground in the Firth of Clyde. She later was refloated with the aid of the boom defence vessel .

Taciturn was sold to Thos. W. Ward and scrapped at Briton Ferry, Wales on 8 August 1971.

References

Publications
 
 

 

British T-class submarines of the Royal Navy
Ships built in Barrow-in-Furness
1944 ships
World War II submarines of the United Kingdom
Cold War submarines of the United Kingdom
Maritime incidents in 1958